Jinhua Homestay Project is a hospitality exchange service organized by the Jinhua Municipal People's Government Foreign and Overseas Chinese Affairs Office. It is a Home+ project initiated to promote tourism in the villages of China by using idle village resources.
The project invites overseas students to stay for a period of 3 weeks and experience the authentic Chinese culture in one of the villages of Jinhua. So far, the sessions were held in Siping, Suoyuan and Yuyuan. During their stay the participants experience and perform various activities which enable them to learn more about traditional Chinese culture, local customs and folklores. 
The project conducts two sessions per year and every session is in a different village. The cost incurred during the project is entirely paid by the project management authorities. The participants will stay with a Chinese family and experience the traditional Chinese lifestyle. 
The participants have to perform a number of tasks during their stay with the purpose to provide for ideas and suggestions to preserve, protect and promote the ancient Chinese villages. The four sessions to date have attracted 163 overseas participants from 27 countries. They made village maps, studied ancient architecture, learned local folk culture and interviewed villagers to discover ancient stories, contributing to the protection and development of the ancient villages.

History
This project is the first of its kind nationally, and it is aimed at protecting the ancient village life. It was realized that while communicating with the outside world language wasn't the major barrier but the lack of understanding and ignorance about the Chinese culture and tradition was the reason that others were not able to understand the Chinese people and connect with them. Thus not language barrier but to break the cultural barrier this program was initiated by the Jinhua Municipal People's government foreign and overseas Chinese affairs office.
Due to urbanization many people from these villages travelled to the bigger cities and the government too did not have adequate funds to provide for 195 of these villages and fund the bigger cities as well. So while bigger cities were gaining popularity the village condition was degrading, thus the Government thought that tourism can help uplift these villages and through this program let the world know about the culture, traditions and people of these villages.
The team who put together this project and has been running it for 3 years now, is the Jinhua Municipal People's government foreign and overseas Chinese affairs office. The project is now conducting its 5th session, being held at Suoyuan village.

Villages
Shangjing Village is located in the west of Jinhua, Zhejiang, 30 km away from Jinhua Downtown area and 2.5 km away from the town of Tangxi, It is close to Yuexi Brook to the East,adjacent to Houdayuan on the South and near the Jiufeng mountain to the West. The village was formerly known as Fenglinzhuang (or Maple Forest Village) and changed to the current name due to its "wind and water favorable" location. Since 1048 when Liu Qing, the first ancestor of Liu clan, brought his family in this village and settled down, the Liu clan has been living here  for 36 generations. Shangjing is laid out generally like a boat setting sail, implying that "the boat sets off smoothly  for a long and good journey". The Village is surrounded by two brooks, called Dongzhen and Xizhen, respectively and dotted with ancient alleys, houses, halls, and  wells here and there. To date, Shainging still preserves more than 50 ancient houses and 20 grand halls that can be dated back to Ming and Qing Dynasties. Among them, is the provincially unique five-room ancestral hall, known as Lui Clan Ancestral Hall and other six architectural sites, that is Baishun Hall, Liuji Hall, Qianji Hall, Xizhen Lane # 48 Folk House (i.e. Upstairs Hall).The Trail Gate Tower, Dragon Eye Well and Lui Clan Ancestral Grave were named the " Provincial Cultural Relics Protection Units" in January 2017.

Siping Village 
This Village is located in Town, in the Wucheng District of Jinhua City, Siping Village boasts a long history of about 700 years. Its well-protected ancient architecture was built in the Hui style, and its delicate brick arts and crafts have attracted the attention of thousands of experts, scholars and tourists. Moreover, Siping has the most charming brick-carving houses and was the Hometown of Yinning, one of the ten great beauties of ancient China. Because Siping was built with the saying "Seven stars around the moon" in mind, there are a number of ancient halls in the Village.

Suoyuan 
village is located 15 km north of Lipu Town, in Jingdong district, Jinhua and 10 km from downtown/urban area, Jinhua. Its name is derived from the shape of the village as it resembles an ancient longevity lock, thus the literal English translation of the name is Jade Garden. Most residents carry the surname “Yan”, as they are descendants of Yan- Zi-Ling, a famous hermit of Eastern Han Dynasty.
This village has a history of over 480 years and the same is reflected by the ancient halls namely Wuben hall, Yan ancestral hall, liagmian halls, Jishu hall, zhongshu hall, huaide hall, Jiyi hall,  henghui hall and yongsi hall which are highlights of the village to serve as major tourist attractions. While many of these halls have a history of over 200 years modern buildings can be seen in the village. Though the village is a little far from the city it has all the facilities like a bakery shop, Coffee shop, a small clinic, and two convenience stores to comfort the travelers. There is also a museum at the north end of the village.
Many young people have left the village to work in cities, a common phenomenon in China today. Therefore, the population consists mainly of older people. However, because Suoyuan is relatively close to Jinhua city, the age profile is more mixed than in similar villages in more remote locations.
It is one of the oldest villages in Jinhua. Its traditional buildings, built of stone or wood, retain many fine and very lifelike carvings of animals, birds, flowers and landscapes. The very first session of this program was held in the year 2014 in Suoyuan village.

Activities

Pottery
Chinese pottery, also called Chinese ceramics are objects made of clay and hardened by heat: earthenware, stoneware, and porcelain. Nowhere in the world has pottery assumed such importance as in China. This project arranges a trip to Just Fire, Guwuyaohuo, which is the most famous pottery factory in Jinhua City, China.
Before visiting the factory the participants are given a lecture on pottery in China generally and about the factory specifically. This lecture is given by Mr. Fang Yi who is the founder of the Just Fire pottery factory. Detailed information is communicated during this lecture at the salon in the respective village where the session is organized. The purpose behind conducting this lecture is to educate the participants so that during their visit to the factory all participants are aware and have a clear understanding of the art of pottery and the factory.
During their visit the participants will visit a museum, within the factory, displaying beautiful pottery and getting to know the ancient and modern forms of pottery. Further the students will practically experience pottery making, where this activity is of two types 1) making of pottery by use of a machine 2) making of pottery by use of only clay and rolling pin. The participants will get a chance to experience both of these types.

Folklore
One of the major features of this program is the hosting of a number of folklore activities. These activities include tea making, paper cutting, shoe-weaving, flower arrangement, grinding tofu, calligraphy, wu opera, niangao making and many more.
The villagers themselves will conduct all these activities so as to make the participants experience the Chinese culture in its most authentic form. Moreover, the techniques and tools used for conducting these activities are also ancient and so the participants will get an understanding as to how Chinese people in past conducted their lifestyle. These activities are conducted in the ancient halls which are built in the village and with the help of a volunteer interpreter the participants can also know about the history of any particular folklore.

Calligraphy 
The practice of calligraphy runs deep in the Chinese culture and is deemed important in their art scene. This project gives the participants and opportunity to know and learn calligraphy from the most famous professor Mr. Wu. 
Mr. Wu will firstly give a lecture on the history and evolution of the practice of calligraphy and later teach the participants himself how calligraphy is to be performed. It is said that the beauty of calligraphy lies in the precision and meaning of the strokes and so a lecture and a practice of the same gives the participants great understanding about this Chinese art.

Wu Opera
Wu Opera, also known as Jinhua Opera, is one of the oldest operas (has a 400-year history) in China. The earliest days of Wu opera can be traced back to Ming Dynasty(AD1386-AD1683). The name originated from Wuzhou, the former name of Jinhua. It's characterized with loud and sonorous singing, ardent and bold manners, and surprisingly special martial arts.  
During this project Wu opera performances are conducted by the students of Jinhua art school and later the participants are taken to China Wu Opera Theatre to experience professional Wu opera performances.
Wu opera artists wear bold and bright makeup so that the expressions and meaning of the song can be dramatically be put forth. Similarly their costumes too are very dramatic consisting of feathers, huge headgears, long robes etc. the participants will get a chance to wear their costumes and makeups and also to know about the history of this form of expression.

Dragon Dance
The dragons hold a very significant position in the Chinese tradition. They are supposed to bring good luck as they possess power, dignity and wisdom. Thus, the Chinese love to perform the Dragon dance during the Chinese New Year. Tourists from around the globe come to china to see this dance style
A huge dragon is made out of wood, with poles places at equal intervals to hold the dragon and it was decorated with beautiful lanterns and flowers. Chinese believe that longer the dragon, more good luck it is supposed to bring to the people. The participants can themselves carry the dragon along with the villagers and perform the dragon dance.

Wood Painting
Let it be grinding of tofu or making of tea, Chinese have their own unique way to do it and so similarly they have a unique way of making beautiful paintings. While strolling around in Suoyuan village you might come across a hall with beautiful paintings, the unique aspect about these paintings is that they are made with the help of wood.
First they carve the painting they want to make on a piece of wood, such wood being soft in material, then they paint the wood with the choice of colours they would want to use and then use this piece of wood as a stamp on a sheet of paper. However the painting contains only five colours and there is a separate piece of wood for every individual color. 
The participants are given a chance to experience this unique way of painting at Jinhua New Year's Painting Museum Where you can make your own painting and take it with you as a memory of one of the many things China has to offer.  The participants can also design their own T-shirts using the same technique. Out of the many activities this program has to offer woodpainting is one of the unique and fun activity which the participants enjoy lot.

Wu Jing Boxing

Chinese Martial Arts are the most traditional martial arts in the world as they existed prior to the 12th century. Chinese Martial Arts include hundreds of different styles and it is undoubtedly the most versatile martial art in the world. Specifically, we learned Wu Jing Boxing from our master. Wu Jing Boxing, which is about 200 years old, is a combination of inside and outside boxing. Every gesture and motion is strong, vicious, flexible, and fairly easy for people to attack and defend. However, the biggest emphasis is to use it to defend
This program organizes martial art training by Mr. Wang Shenjiang who has 57 years of experience in Wu Jing Boxing and he was also a school teacher for many years. The moves and tactics which are learnt throughout the session are then performed by the participants during the closing ceremony.

References 

Cultural organizations based in China
Tourism in China
Hospitality exchange services
Culture in Zhejiang